Pedro Amador may refer to:
Pedro Amador (soldier) (1735–1824), Spanish soldier
Pedro Amador (footballer) (born 1998), Portuguese footballer who plays as a leftback